This is map and list of European countries by budget revenues and budget revenues per capita for year 2013 from Eurostat and CIA World Factbook. Countries in blue have more than €100 billion, green €10-€99 billion and yellow below €10 billion budget revenues from Eurostat and CIA Factbook

See also
International organisations in Europe
List of European countries by budget revenues per capita
List of European countries by GDP (nominal) per capita
List of European countries by GDP (PPP) per capita 
List of European countries by GNI (nominal) per capita 
List of European countries by GNI (PPP) per capita 
List of countries by GDP (nominal) per capita
List of countries by GDP (PPP) per capita
List of countries by GDP (nominal)
List of countries by GDP (PPP)

References

Budget revenues
Europe budget revenues
Europe Budget revenues
Economy of Europe-related lists